CLUMEQ (Consortium Laval-UQAM-McGill and Eastern Quebec) was a Supercomputer based in McGill University  founded in 2001 and has received two successive grants from the Canada Foundation for innovation. In 2011 CLUMEQ and its partner organization RQCHP were consolidated into a new consortium Calcul Quebéc.

Computers

Past
Beowulf Cluster
256 CPUs
AMD Athlon 1900+ 
1.6 GHz and 1.5 GB RAM / CPU 
Myrinet-2000 Switch 
366 GB RAID-5 storage

SGI Origin 3800
Sixty-four 600 MHz MIPS R14000 microprocessors
128 GB RAM
1.6 TB storage

Colosse
 960 Sun Blade X6275 nodes (7680 cores total)
 23 TB RAM
 Infiniband QDR network
 1000 TB storage

Krylov
 48 Sun Fire X4100 nodes (300 cores total)
 384 GB RAM
 15 TB storage

Guillimin
 1200 compute nodes * 2 Intel Xeon 5650 hexa-core CPUs per node = 14400 cores @ 2.66 GHz
 46 TB RAM
 Infiniband QDR network
 2 PB storage

References

External links
CLUMEQ official site
The latest supercomputer, article in McGill Reporter

Supercomputer sites